In the Line of Duty may refer to:

Film and television
 In the Line of Duty (1917 film), an Austrian silent film
 In the Line of Duty (film series), a series of Hong Kong action films
 "In the Line of Duty" (Stargate SG-1), a 1998 episode of Stargate SG-1
 "In the Line of Duty", a 2015 episode of NCIS: Los Angeles

See also
 Line of Duty, a British police procedural television series, aired from 2012 on
 Line of Duty (film), a 2019 Netflix film
 In Line of Duty, a 1931 American western film